Kosso is the common name of the east African tree Hagenia abyssinica.

Kosso may also refer to:

 Coşava, a Romanian village, Kossó in Hungarian
 Pterocarpus erinaceus, a west African tree